The Judo competition at the 1986 Asian Games was held at Saemaul Sports Hall from 1 to 4 October 1986 and contested in eight weight classes, for only men. This was the first competition of Judo for Asian Games.

The host nation South Korea dominated the competition winning six out of eight possible gold medals.

Medalists

Medal table

References

Medalists from previous Asian Games – Men

External links
 
 Olympic Council of Asia

 
1986 Asian Games events
1986
Asian Games
1986 Asian Games